Fernando de la Mora may refer to:
 Fernando de la Mora, Paraguay, a city in the Central Department of Paraguay
 Club Fernando de la Mora, a football club in Asunción, Paraguay
 Fernando de la Mora (tenor) (born 1958), Mexican operatic tenor
 Fernando de la Mora (politician) (1773–1835), one of the founding fathers of Paraguay

de la Mora, Fernando